Presidential elections were held in Tajikistan on 6 November 1994. Emomali Rahmonov, who had been de facto president since 1992, ran for the revived post with the support (though not the formal nomination) of the Communist Party of Tajikistan and won 59.5% of the vote. Voter turnout was 95.0%.

Background
The elections took place amidst the ongoing civil war, although a round of talks in Tehran in September 1994 provided for a formal cease-fire, scheduled to end on 5 November. The initial scheduled date for the elections was 25 September, but by early September only Rahmonov was registered. The Russian and Uzbek governments put pressure on Rahmonov, resulting in the postponement of the election to 6 November and extension of the nomination deadline until 27 October.

Campaign
Although the second registered candidate, Abdumalik Abdullajanov, was not a decoy figure, the main opposition forces had not been allowed to form political parties and were effectively shut out of political activity prior to the elections. As a result, the opposition boycotted the elections, saying that a fair contest was impossible with Rahmonov in power.

Conduct
The election process was described in a 1995 US State Department report as favoring the incumbent ruler and being non-fair: intimidation and ballot-box stuffing was reported, vote rigging was suspected.

Results

References

1995 in Tajikistan
Presidential elections in Tajikistan
Tajikistan
Election and referendum articles with incomplete results